The 2022–23 season is the 89th season in the existence of Peterborough United Football Club and the club's first season back in League One since the 2020–21 season following their relegation in the previous season. In addition to the league, they will also compete in the 2022–23 FA Cup, the 2022–23 EFL Cup and the 2022–23 EFL Trophy.

First-team squad

Statistics

|-
|colspan=14|Players who left the club:

|}

Goals record

Disciplinary record

Transfers

In

Out

Loans in

Loans out

Pre-season and friendlies
On May 31, the Posh announced their first pre-season friendly, against Scunthorpe United. Four days later, an away trip to King's Lynn Town was confirmed. A home friendly against Luton Town was next to be added to the schedule. On 10 June, a fourth friendly, against Stevenage was added. A week later, a second home pre-season friendly was confirmed, against Hull City. A sixth addition to the pre-season schedule was confirmed against Barnet. During their pre-season camp in Portugal, they will face Leyton Orient in Lagos. A late addition to the diary, against Deeping Rangers was also confirmed.

Competitions

Overall record

League One

League table

Results summary

Results by round

Matches

On 23 June, the league fixtures were announced.

FA Cup

Peterborough were drawn at home to Salford City in the first round and away to Shrewsbury Town in the second round.

EFL Cup

The Posh were drawn away to Plymouth Argyle in the first round and to Stevenage in the second round.

EFL Trophy

On 20 June, the initial Group stage draw was made, grouping Peterborough United with Stevenage and Wycombe Wanderers. Three days later, Tottenham Hotspur joined Southern Group D. In the second round, The Posh were drawn away to Chelsea U21.

References

Peterborough United
Peterborough United F.C. seasons